The West Branch Machias River is a  tributary of the Machias River in Maine. The river starts from Sabao Dam on the Lower Pond of Lower Sabao Lake.

See also
List of rivers of Maine

References

Maine Streamflow Data from the USGS
Maine Watershed Data From Environmental Protection Agency

Rivers of Hancock County, Maine
Rivers of Washington County, Maine
Rivers of Maine